Juliet, Naked is a 2018 romantic comedy film directed by Jesse Peretz based on Nick Hornby's 2009 novel of the same name. It centers on the story of Annie (Rose Byrne), and her unlikely romance with singer-songwriter Tucker Crowe (Ethan Hawke), who is also the subject of her boyfriend's (Chris O'Dowd) long-time music obsession. The film premiered at the Sundance Film Festival on January 19, 2018.

Plot
Annie Platt contemplates escaping her hometown of Sandcliff, England, her job as a curator in a local museum, and her unhappy relationship with Duncan, a college teacher obsessed with Tucker Crowe, an American musician last heard from in 1993. An album titled Juliet, Naked arrives in the mail, containing acoustic demos from Crowe's breakthrough album Juliet. Annie and Duncan argue over its quality, and Annie writes a negative review on Duncan's fan site dedicated to Crowe.

Crowe himself emails Annie, thanking her for her honesty, and they strike up a correspondence. Crowe shares his regrets at being a poor father to four children from three different mothers (later revealed to be five children with four different mothers), and Annie discloses her disappointment at not having children.

Crowe lives on his ex's property to be near his youngest son Jackson in America. Lizzie, his pregnant daughter from another relationship, visits from London; it is revealed Crowe also has twin sons from yet another relationship. Before leaving, Lizzie offers him the phone number of his other daughter Grace, whom he has never met.

Duncan invites Gina, a new teacher at his college, over to hear the album, and they sleep together. Confessing this to Annie, she breaks up with him and asks him to move out.

When Lizzie has her baby prematurely, Crowe takes Jackson with him to London to check on her. He and Annie agree to meet, but he has a heart attack. She visits him in the hospital, where she meets Jackson, Lizzie, and most of Crowe's exes and other children who have flown to his bedside. Crowe asks to see Sandcliff, and he and Jackson come to stay with Annie.

Duncan runs into Annie and Crowe, who introduces himself, but Duncan does not believe him. Annie finds Duncan lurking outside her home, and Crowe proves his identity with his passport. He stays for dinner, but his obsession with Crowe's work annoys Crowe, who declares that he thinks 'Juliet' is worthless. Duncan leaves, asserting that art may mean more to the audience than the artist, and how important the album has been to him.

Crowe tells Annie why he left music 25 years ago: Julie, his ex whose breakup inspired Juliet, visited him at his gig with their child, Grace. Left holding the baby, Crowe panicked, leaving her in the restroom and walking away from the gig and music entirely. Crowe calls Grace, but she wants nothing to do with him.

At Annie's museum exhibition, she confesses her romantic interest in Crowe, who reciprocates. The town's mayor has him sing for the exhibition, and he reluctantly performs “Waterloo Sunset” by The Kinks. That night, Annie and Crowe try to have sex, but an ill Jackson interrupts, wanting to go home.

Annie drives Crowe and Jackson to the home of Lizzie, who has been abandoned by her son's musician father, and Annie says farewell. Back home, she is at a bar when Duncan pleads for a fresh start together, but she declines.

A year later, Annie emails Crowe, explaining that she has moved to London and decided to have a child on her own; they agree to meet.

During the credits, a video of Duncan from his site reveals that Crowe has released a new album So Where Was I?, inspired by Annie. The album's song titles, and Duncan's scathing critique, suggests that Crowe and Annie are living happily together, much to Duncan's chagrin.

Cast
 Rose Byrne as Annie Platt
 Ethan Hawke as Tucker Crowe
 Chris O'Dowd as Duncan Thomson
 Azhy Robertson as Jackson, Tucker's son
 Lily Brazier as Ros Platt, Annie's sister
 Ayoola Smart as Lizzie, Tucker's daughter
 Lily Newmark as Carly
 Denise Gough as Gina
 Eleanor Matsuura as Cat, Tucker's ex
 Megan Dodds as Carrie, Tucker's ex
Emma Paetz as Grace
 Jimmy O. Yang as Elliott
 Phil Davis as Mayor Terry Barton

Production
Harbour Street in Broadstairs was the exterior for Annie Platt's house in Sandcliff. Broadstairs' streets and beach also featured as Sandcliff, including Morelli's Ice Cream Parlour. Further filming took place at Ramsgate Maritime Museum, which features as Sandcliff Museum interior where Annie Platt works, as well as the Royal Harbour in Ramsgate, which can also be seen in various scenes. Production also filmed at Home Farm in the Borough of Swale which features as Tucker Crowe's 'mancave' and his ex-wife's house in the US.

The movie includes new songs written by Ryan Adams, Robyn Hitchcock, Conor Oberst and M. Ward, as well as the film's composer, Nathan Larson.

Release
Lionsgate and sister company Roadside Attractions acquired US rights to distribute the film, and planned to release the film on August 17, 2018, at select theaters, while a nationwide release occurred on August 31, 2018.

Reception
The website's critical consensus reads, "Juliet, Nakeds somewhat familiar narrative arc is elevated by standout work from a charming cast led by a well-matched Rose Byrne and Ethan Hawke." Metacritic gives the film a weighted average rating of 67 out of 100, based on 33 reviews, indicating "generally favorable reviews".

References

External links
 
 

2018 films
2018 romantic comedy films
British romantic comedy films
American romantic comedy films
Apatow Productions films
Films based on British novels
Films based on works by Nick Hornby
Films produced by Judd Apatow
Lionsgate films
Roadside Attractions films
Films with screenplays by Tamara Jenkins
2018 independent films
Films with screenplays by Jim Taylor (writer)
Films directed by Jesse Peretz
2010s English-language films
2010s American films
2010s British films